Gape Mohutsiwa (born 20 March 1997) is a Motswana footballer who currently plays for ASO Chlef.

References

External links
 

1997 births
Living people
Botswana footballers
Botswana international footballers
Motlakase Power Dynamos players
Township Rollers F.C. players
Gilport Lions F.C. players
Jwaneng Galaxy F.C. players
Association football midfielders